River City Revival is the second studio album by the American heavy metal band Alabama Thunderpussy, released in 1999.

Critical reception
The Austin Chronicle thought that "with seven songs in just over a half hour, the crew's heavy but lyrical riffs are immersed in a raw V-8 production aesthetic, and the results weigh on your back like concentrated heat; could be a massage, could be a bruise."

AllMusic wrote: "Forceful, brutal, and blistering, River City Revival fits right in with the alternative metal climate of the late '90s—this is hardly an album that can be accused of having a lot of slickness or pop gloss."

Track listing
 "Dry Spell" - 3:28
 "Spineless" - 4:28
 "Heathen" - 6:52
 "Mosquito" - 3:43
 "Giving Up On Living" - 4:59
 "Own Worst Enemy" - 6:11
 "Rockin' Is Ma Business" (The Four Horsemen cover) - 3:57
 "Heavyweight" (on Relapse Records reissue) - 3:37
 "Rabdos" (on Relapse Records Reissue) - 4:37
 "I Can't Feel Nothin (on Relapse Records reissue) - 3:05

Personnel
 Johnny Throckmorton - vocals
 Erik Larson - guitar
 Asechiah "Cleetus LeRoque" Bogden - guitar
 Bill Storms - bass
 Bryan Cox - drums

References

1999 albums
Alabama Thunderpussy albums